Singasholpur Union is an Union parishad of Narail Sadar Upazila, Narail District in Khulna Division of Bangladesh. It has an area of 39.63 km2 (15.30 sq mi) and a population of 16,034.

References

Unions of Narail Sadar Upazila
Unions of Narail District
Unions of Khulna Division